Salvador Ernesto Mira Vásquez (born August 23, 1984 in Mejicanos, San Salvador) is a Salvadoran race walker. He set both a national record and a personal best time of 3:59:51, by finishing fourth in the men's 50 km race walk at the 2007 Pan American Games in Rio de Janeiro, Brazil.

Mira represented El Salvador at the 2008 Summer Olympics, where he competed for the men's 50 km race walk. Unfortunately, Mira received a final warning (a total of three red cards) for not following the proper form during the 25 km lap, and was subsequently disqualified from the competition.

Personal best
20 km race walk: 1:26:09 hrs –  San Salvador, 10 December 2005
50 km race walk: 3:59:51 hrs –  Rio de Janeiro, 28 July 2007

Achievements

References

External links

NBC 2008 Olympics profile

1984 births
Living people
Salvadoran male racewalkers
Olympic athletes of El Salvador
Athletes (track and field) at the 2007 Pan American Games
Athletes (track and field) at the 2008 Summer Olympics
Pan American Games competitors for El Salvador
People from San Salvador Department
21st-century Salvadoran people